This is a list of public libraries in Massachusetts, USA.

The majority (but not all) of the libraries without a consortium link, in the following counties, belong to:
Berkshire, Franklin, Hampden, Hampshire, Middlesex and Worcester - C/W MARS Member List
Bristol, Norfolk and Plymouth - SAILS Library Network Member List
There are also a small number of libraries on the MassCat system. Member List

See also
 Cape Libraries Automated Materials Sharing (CLAMS)
 C/W MARS (Central/Western Massachusetts Automated Resource Sharing)
 List of Carnegie libraries in Massachusetts
 Massachusetts Board of Library Commissioners
 Massachusetts Library System
 Merrimack Valley Library Consortium (MVLC)
 Metro Boston Library Network (MBLN)
 Minuteman Library Network (MLN)
 North of Boston Library Exchange (NOBLE)
 Old Colony Library Network (OCLN)
 SAILS Library Network (SAILS)
 List of libraries in 18th century Massachusetts
 Books in the United States

Further reading
 Report of the Free Public Library Commission of Massachusetts. v.1-8 (1891–1898); v.9 (1899); v.10-18 (1900–1908); v.19-24 (1909–1914); v.25-27 (1915–1917); v.28-51 (1918–1940).
 Massachusetts Board of Free Public Library Commissioners. Free public library buildings of Massachusetts: a roll of honor, 1918. Wright & Potter printing co., state printers, 1919

External links

 Massachusetts Board of Library Commissioners. Find a Library Near You (directory)
 Massachusetts Board of Library Commissioners. Massachusetts Library Directory
 Massachusetts Library Association
 Massachusetts Friends of Libraries
 Boston Regional Library System
 Cape and Islands Libraries Automated Materials Sharing
 Metrowest MA Regional Library System
 Southeastern Massachusetts Library System
 Western Massachusetts Regional Library System

Libraries
Massachusetts
Libraries